Halifa Houmadi is a politician from Comoros who served as Prime minister of Comoros.

Career 
In 14 October 1994, he was appointed as Prime Minister by Said Mohamed Djohar. He was fifteenth Prime Minister appointed by Said Mohamed Djohar. In 29 April 1995 he resigned as Prime Minister.

References 

Living people
Prime Ministers of the Comoros
Year of birth missing (living people)